Here We Go Again is an American sitcom that aired on ABC from January to April 1973 on Saturday nights. The show, produced by Metromedia/Bobka Productions, ran for 13 episodes. It was the lowest ranked out of 75 shows that season, with a 7.2 rating.

Premise
The show portrayed the lives of two divorced couples. Richard and Judy, who have a son, Jeff, divorce after 17 years of marriage due to incompatibility. Jerry and Susan, who have two children, Cindy and Jan, divorce after a ten-year marriage due to adultery. Richard and Susan fall in love and marry. He moves into Susan's house, which is near the homes of their ex-spouses.

Cast
Larry Hagman as Richard Evans
Diane Baker as Susan Standish-Evans
Dick Gautier as Jerry Standish
Nita Talbot as Judy Evans
Leslie Graves as Cindy Standish
Kim Richards as Jan Standish
Chris Beaumont as Jeff Evans

Episodes

References

External links

1973 American television series debuts
1973 American television series endings
1970s American sitcoms
American Broadcasting Company original programming
English-language television shows
Television series by Metromedia
Television shows set in California